Hold Me in Your Arms is the second studio album by English singer Rick Astley, released on 26 November 1988 by RCA Records. It is the follow-up to his successful debut album Whenever You Need Somebody, and was his last album produced and written with the Stock Aitken Waterman team.

Background
Half of the tracks on Hold Me in Your Arms were written and produced by Stock Aitken Waterman and the other half were Astley's own compositions, produced by PWL associates Phil Harding, Ian Curnow and Daize Washbourn. The release of the album was delayed a few months due to a fire at PWL Studios which destroyed some of Astley's recorded material. This would be Astley's last album with Stock Aitken Waterman, due to Astley wanting to leave behind the dance-pop sound of the producers and wanting to shed his boy next door image. Astley wanted to focus on his original compositions for future albums, reappearing in 1991 with the soul album Free.

A remastered version of Hold Me in Your Arms, containing some remixes, was released on 12 April 2010.

Single releases
The album spawned five singles. Unlike his previous album, where all the singles were Stock Aitken Waterman compositions and productions, Astley's compositions were also released as singles. The lead single, "She Wants to Dance with Me", was Astley's first single that he wrote himself, and became a worldwide top 10 hit. In Europe, "Take Me to Your Heart" and "Hold Me in Your Arms" were released as the next singles. "Giving Up on Love" was released as the second single from the album in the US and Canada, and was later released in some countries of continental Europe as the fourth and last single from the album, and a cover of The Temptations' "Ain't Too Proud to Beg" was released as the third and last single in the US and Japan.

Commercial performance
Hold Me in Your Arms continued Astley's success, with the three UK singles from the album becoming top 10 hits. While it did not achieve the same level of sales as his debut album, it sold well all around the world, achieving Platinum and Gold certifications worldwide.

Track listing
All tracks written by Rick Astley, except where noted.
"She Wants to Dance with Me" – 3:14
"Take Me to Your Heart" (Stock Aitken Waterman) – 3:27
"I Don't Want to Lose Her" (Stock Aitken Waterman) – 3:31
"Giving Up on Love" – 4:01
"Ain't Too Proud to Beg" (Eddie Holland, Norman Whitfield) – 4:19
"Till Then (Time Stands Still)" (Stock Aitken Waterman) – 3:14
"Dial My Number" – 4:09
"I'll Never Let You Down" – 3:55
"I Don't Want to Be Your Lover" – 3:58
"Hold Me in Your Arms" – 4:32

2010 bonus tracks
 "My Arms Keep Missing You" (Stock Aitken Waterman) – 3.14
 "I'll Be Fine" (Rick Astley) – 3:44
 "She Wants to Dance with Me" [Extended Mix] – 7:14
 "Take Me to Your Heart" [Autumn Leaves Mix] – 6:38
 "My Arms Keep Missing You" [The No L Mix] – 6:46
 "Hold Me in Your Arms" [Extended Mix] – 7:37
 "Rick's Hit Mix" [Megamix] – 5:49

Disc two (remixes and instrumentals)
 "My Arms Keep Missing You" [The "Where's Harry?" Remix] – 3.15
 "Giving Up On Love" [7" R&B Mix] – 4:07
 "She Wants To Dance With Me" [Bordering On A Collie Mix] – 6:04
 "Take Me to Your Heart" [The Dick Dastardly Mix] – 6:59
 "Hold Me In Your Arms" [Hold Me In Your Prayers Mix] – 6:53
 "Giving Up On Love" [12" R&B Extended Mix] – 7:08
 "My Arms Keep Missing You" [Bruno's Mix] – 6:15
 "She Wants To Dance With Me" [US Remix] – 5:42
 "Giving Up On Love" [12" Pop Extended Mix] – 7:18
 "She Wants To Dance With Me" [Dave Ford Remix] – 5:00
 "My Arms Keep Missing You" [Dub] – 4:54
 "Giving Up On Love" [12" Dub Mix] – 5:00
 "She Wants To Dance With Me" [Instrumental] – 4:53
 "Take Me to Your Heart" [Instrumental] – 3:27

Personnel
Adapted from AllMusic.

 Robert Ahwai – guitar
 Matt Aitken – guitar, keyboards, producer
 Rick Astley – drums, keyboards, lead vocals, producer, background vocals
 Gary Barnacle – saxophone
 Jason Barron – assistant
 Paul Cox – photography
 Ian Curnow – Fairlight, keyboards, producer, programming
 Steve Davies – assistant
 Peter Day – assistant
 Stewart Day – assistant
 George DeAngelis – keyboards
 Gordon Dennis – assistant
 Mike Duffy – engineer
 Dave Ford – mixing
 Les Spaine Jr – assistant
 Julian Gingell – assistant
 Peter Hammond – mixing
 Phil Harding – engineer, mixing, producer
 Karen Hewitt – engineer
 Tony King – assistant
 Shirley Lewis – background vocals
 A. Linn – drums
 Roddy Matthews – guitar
 Mainartery – sleeve design
 Chris McDonnell – assistant
 Mark McGuire – engineer
 Mae McKenna – background vocals
 Leroy Osbourne – background vocals
 Mike Stock – keyboards, producer, background vocals
 Philip Todd – saxophone
 Daize Washbourn – drums, keyboards, producer
 Pete Waterman – producer
 Yo-Yo – engineer

Charts

Weekly charts

Year-end charts

Certifications

References

1988 albums
Albums produced by Stock Aitken Waterman
RCA Records albums
Rick Astley albums